Talavar-e Do (also Romanized as Talāvar-e Do; also known as Talāvar and Ţalāvar-e Soflá) is a village in Seydun-e Shomali Rural District, Seydun District, Bagh-e Malek County, Khuzestan Province, Iran. At the 2006 census, its population was 423, in 72 families.

References 

Populated places in Bagh-e Malek County